Martin Hrbáček (born 12 October 1970) is a Slovak cyclist. He competed in the men's sprint at the 1996 Summer Olympics.

References

1970 births
Living people
Slovak male cyclists
Olympic cyclists of Slovakia
Cyclists at the 1996 Summer Olympics
Sportspeople from Bratislava